United Nations Security Council resolution 878, adopted unanimously on 29 October 1993, after reaffirming resolutions 733 (1992), 746 (1992), 751 (1992), 767 (1992), 775 (1992), 794 (1992), 814 (1993), 837 (1993) and 865 (1993) on Somalia, the Council expressed its commitment to a future concerted strategy for the United Nations Operation in Somalia II (UNOSOM II) and extended its mandate for an interim period until 18 November 1993.

The Secretary-General Boutros Boutros-Ghali was requested to report on recent developments in Somalia and on a further extension of UNOSOM II's mandate before 18 November 1993.

See also
 History of Somalia
 List of United Nations Security Council Resolutions 801 to 900 (1993–1994)
 Somali Civil War

References

External links
 
Text of the Resolution at undocs.org

 0878
1993 in Somalia
 0878
October 1993 events